The women's scratch race during the second round of the 2009–2010 UCI Track Cycling World Cup Classics was the second women's scratch race in this season. It took place in Melbourne, Australia on 19 November 2009. Thirty-six athletes participated in the contest.

Competition format
A scratch race is a race in which all riders start together and the object is simply to be first over the finish line after a certain number of laps. There are no intermediate points or sprints.

The tournament consisted of two qualifying heats of 7.5 km (30 laps). The top twelve cyclist of each heat advanced to the 10 km final (40 laps).

Schedule
Thursday 19 November
17:15-17:35 Qualifying
20:45-21:05 Final
21:30-21:35 Victory Ceremony

Schedule from Tissottiming.com

Results

Qualifying

Qualifying Heat 1

Results from Tissottiming.com.

Qualifying Heat 2

Results from Tissottiming.com.

Final

Results from Tissottiming.com.

See also
 2009–10 UCI Track Cycling World Cup Classics – Round 2 – Women's individual pursuit
 2009–10 UCI Track Cycling World Cup Classics – Round 2 – Women's points race
 2009–10 UCI Track Cycling World Cup Classics – Round 2 – Women's team pursuit

References

UCI Track Cycling World Cup Classics Round 2 Womens scratch race
UCI Track Cycling World Cup – Women's scratch
UCI Track Cycling World Cup Classics Round 2 Womens scratch race